Terence Allan "Terry" McNee (5 June 1925 – October 1999) was an English professional footballer who played as a goalkeeper. He made 11 appearances in the English football league for Wrexham in the 1946–47 season. He also played for Park Villa and Rhyl.

References

1925 births
1999 deaths
English footballers
Association football goalkeepers
Park Villa F.C. players
Wrexham A.F.C. players
Rhyl F.C. players
English Football League players